Ramdas Kathiababa 
() (early 24 July 1800 – 8 February 1909) was a Hindu saint of the Hindu Dwaitadwaitavaadi Nimbarka Sampradaya. The 54th Acharya of the Nimbark community, Sri Sri 108 Swami Ramdas Kathia Babaji Maharaj, was known everywhere as Kathia Baba. He was born about two hundred years ago in the village of Lonachamari in the state of Punjab.

References

Place of birth unknown
Date of death unknown
19th-century Hindu religious leaders
Indian Hindu monks
Indian Hindu spiritual teachers
Indian Vaishnavites
Vaishnava saints